Donald A. E. Beer (May 31, 1935 – January 25, 1997) was an American competition rower from Massachusetts, and Olympic champion.

He received a gold medal in eights with the American rowing team at the 1956 Summer Olympics in Melbourne. The eight rowers were Yale undergraduates. 
Beer was a member of the Class of 1957 and graduated from Harvard Business School in 1959.

References

External links
Donald Beer's obituary

1935 births
1997 deaths
Olympic gold medalists for the United States in rowing
Rowers at the 1956 Summer Olympics
American male rowers
Medalists at the 1956 Summer Olympics
Yale Bulldogs rowers
Harvard Business School alumni